In combinatorial optimization, the Gomory–Hu tree of an undirected graph with capacities is a weighted tree that represents the minimum s-t cuts for all s-t pairs in the graph. The Gomory–Hu tree can be constructed in  maximum flow computations.

Definition
Let G = ((VG, EG), c) be an undirected graph with c(u,v) being the capacity of the edge (u,v) respectively.

 Denote the minimum capacity of an s-t cut by λst for each s, t ∈ VG.
 Let T = (VG, ET) be a tree, denote the set of edges in an s-t path by Pst for each s, t ∈ VG.
Then T is said to be a Gomory–Hu tree of G, if for each s, t ∈ VG
 λst = mine∈Pst c(Se, Te),
where
 Se, Te ⊆ VG are the two connected components of T∖{e}, and thus (Se, Te) form an s-t cut in G.
 c(Se, Te) is the capacity of the cut in G.

Algorithm
Gomory–Hu Algorithm
Input: A weighted undirected graph G = ((VG, EG), c)
 Output: A Gomory–Hu Tree T = (VT, ET).
1. Set VT = {VG} and ET = ∅.
2. Choose some X∈VT with | X | ≥ 2 if such X exists. Otherwise, go to step 6.
3. For each connected component C = (VC, EC) in T∖X. Let SC = ∪vT∈VC vT. Let S = { SC | C is a connected component in T∖X}.
    Contract the components to form G' = ((VG', EG'), c'), where
 VG' = X ∪ S.
 EG' = EG|X×X ∪ {(u, SC) ∈ X×S | (u,v)∈EG for some v∈SC}  ∪ {(SC1, SC2) ∈ S×S | (u,v)∈EG for some u∈SC1 and v∈SC2}.
 c' : VG'×VG'→R+ is the capacity function defined as,
 if (u,SC)∈EG|X×S, c'(u,SC) = Σv∈SC:(u,v)∈EGc(u,v),
 if (SC1,SC2)∈EG|S×S, c'(SC1,SC2) = Σ(u,v)∈EG:u∈SC1∧v∈SC2 c(u,v),
 c'(u,v) = c(u,v) otherwise.
4. Choose two vertices s, t ∈ X and find a minimum s-t cut (A',B') in G'.
    Set A = (∪SC∈A'∩S SC) ∪ (A' ∩ X) and B = (∪SC∈B'∩S SC) ∪ (B' ∩ X).
 5. Set VT = (VT∖X) ∪ {A ∩ X, B ∩ X}.
    For each e = (X, Y) ∈ ET do
 If Y ⊂ A, set e' = (A ∩ X, Y), else set e' = (B ∩ X, Y).
 Set ET = (ET∖{e}) ∪ {e'} and w(e') = w(e).
    Set ET = ET ∪ {(A∩X, B∩X)}.
    Set w((A∩X, B∩X)) = c'(A', B').
    Go to step 2.
 6. Replace each {v} ∈ VT by v and each ({u},{v}) ∈ ET by (u,v). Output T.

Analysis
Using the submodular property of the capacity function c, one has
 c(X) + c(Y) ≥ c(X ∩ Y) + c(X ∪ Y).
Then it can be shown that the minimum s-t cut in G' is also a minimum s-t cut in G for any s, t ∈ X.

To show that for all (P, Q) ∈ ET, w(P,Q) = λpq for some p ∈ P, q ∈ Q throughout the algorithm, one makes use of the following Lemma,
 For any i, j, k in VG, λik ≥ min(λij, λjk).

The Lemma can be used again repeatedly to show that the output T satisfies the properties of a Gomory–Hu Tree.

Example
The following is a simulation of the Gomory–Hu's algorithm, where
 green circles are vertices of T.
 red and blue circles are the vertices in G'.
 grey vertices are the chosen s and t.
 red and blue coloring represents the s-t cut.
 dashed edges are the s-t cut-set.
 A is the set of vertices circled in red and B is the set of vertices circled in blue.

Implementations: Sequential and Parallel 
Gusfield's algorithm can be used to find a Gomory–Hu tree without any vertex contraction in the same running time-complexity, which simplifies the implementation of constructing a Gomory–Hu Tree.

Andrew V. Goldberg and K. Tsioutsiouliklis implemented the Gomory-Hu algorithm and Gusfield algorithm, and performed an experimental evaluation and comparison.

Cohen et al. report results on two parallel implementations of Gusfield's algorithm using OpenMP and MPI, respectively.

Related concepts
In planar graphs, the Gomory–Hu tree is dual to the minimum weight cycle basis, in the sense that the cuts of the Gomory–Hu tree are dual to a collection of cycles in the dual graph that form a minimum-weight cycle basis.

See also
 Cut (graph theory)
 Max-flow min-cut theorem
 Maximum flow problem

References

 

Combinatorial optimization
Network flow problem
Graph algorithms